Passive Aggressive: Singles 2002–2010 is a compilation album by The Radio Dept. It was released in double CD and vinyl formats on January 25, 2011.

It features a disc of all the band's singles released to date, from all of their three previous LPs, and stand-alone and online-only singles such as "Anne Laurie" and "The New Improved Hypocrisy". A second disc of B-sides and rarities is also included.

Track listing

References

External links
http://pitchfork.com/news/40624-the-radio-dept-ready-singles-compilation/
http://theradiodept.com/discography/passive-aggressive-singles-2002-2010-2-cd-ep-compilation-and-b-sides-album

2011 compilation albums
The Radio Dept. albums
Labrador Records albums